Saeid Ebrahimi (born 22 December 1982 in Nahavand) is an Iranian wrestler. He competed in the freestyle heavyweight division the 2008 Summer Olympics in Beijing, reaching the quarter finals.

References

External links
 

Living people
1982 births
Iranian male sport wrestlers
Olympic wrestlers of Iran
Wrestlers at the 2008 Summer Olympics
People from Nahavand
World Wrestling Championships medalists
20th-century Iranian people
21st-century Iranian people